The term Thraco-Illyrian refers to a hypothesis according to which the Daco-Thracian and Illyrian languages comprise a distinct branch of Indo-European. Thraco-Illyrian is also used as a term merely implying a Thracian-Illyrian interference,  mixture or sprachbund, or as a shorthand way of saying that it is not determined whether a subject is to be considered as pertaining to Thracian or Illyrian. Downgraded to a geo-linguistic concept, these languages are referred to as Paleo-Balkan.

The linguistical hypothesis was especially current in the early 20th century, but after the 1960s it was seriously called into question. New publications argued that no strong evidence for Thraco-Illyrian exists, and that the two language-areas show more differences than correspondences (Vladimir Georgiev, Eric Hamp, et al.), whereas more recent linguists like Sorin Paliga have argued that based on the available data, Illyrian and Thracian were mutually intelligible or at very least formed a dialect continuum in a way comparable to Czech-Slovak and Spanish-Portuguese or Continental Scandinavian languages (Danish, Norwegian and Swedish).

Linguistic contact and similarity
The Vardar, South Morava and Great Morava rivers are generally considered to approximate the border between the Illyrian and Thracian spheres, in the west and east respectively. However, Thracian and Illyrian did not have a clear-cut frontier.
There was also, clearly, significant interaction between the Illyrian and Thracian spheres, with some Thracian groups occupying the Illyrian sphere and vice versa; the identity of some groups as Illyrian or Thracian has also remained unclear, or, in some instances, a Thraco-Illyrian mix. Such factors reinforce the impression that many similarities between the Illyrian and Thracian lexes resulted from language contact.

Other scholars, such as Romanian linguist and historian , argue that there were major similarities between Illyrian and Thracian and so a shared, ancestral linguistic branch is probable, rather than them forming a sprachbund. Among the Thraco-Illyrian correspondences noted by I. I. Russu are the following:

Not many Thraco-Illyrian correspondences are definite, and a number may be incorrect, even from the list above. Sorin Paliga (2002) however states: "According to the available data, we may surmise that Thracian and Illyrian were mutually understandable, e.g. like Czech and Slovak, in one extreme, or like Spanish and Portuguese, at the other."

Other linguists however argue that Illyrian and Thracian were different Indo-European branches which later converged through contact. It is also of significance that Illyrian languages still have not been classified whether they were centum or satem language, while it is undisputed that Thracian was a satem language by the Classical Period (the satem nature of proto-Thracian is disputed, Olteanu 2002).

Due to the fragmentary attestation of both Illyrian and Thraco-Dacian, the existence of a Thraco-Illyrian branch remains controversial. Evidence of a Thraco-Illyrian branch has also been sought in the Albanian language, which might have developed from either a Thraco-Dacian language with Illyrian influences or an Illyrian language with Thraco-Dacian influences, or from a totally unattested Balkan Indo-European language that was closely related to Illyrian and Messapic.

See also
 Albanian language
 Balkan sprachbund
 Classification of Thracian
 Dacian language
 Paleo-Balkan languages
 Romanian words of possible Dacian origin (and comparison with Albanian words)
 Albanian–Romanian linguistic relationship
 Thracian language
 Venetic language

Notes
 The place of Paeonian remains unclear. Not much has been determined in the study of Paeonian, and some linguists do not recognize a Paeonian area separate from Illyrian or Thracian. The place of Ancient Macedonian is also undetermined. Paliga (2002) states: "It is therefore difficult to say whether the ancient Macedonians spoke an idiom closer to Thracian, Illyrian, Greek or a specific idiom."

References

Bibliography
 Georgiev, Vladimir.
 Paliga, Sorin. Pre-Slavic place-names. 2002.
 
 

 
Indo-European linguistics
Thracian language
Dacian language